Madurai has well-developed transport facilities. Modes of transport in Madurai include road, rail and air. Madurai faces increasing daily traffic problems, so master plans have been prepared to reduce the city traffic and traffic problems in suburbs.

Road 
Madurai is located in the southern part of Tamil Nadu. It is the third largest city in Tamil Nadu and connects the southern districts to northern districts in Tamil Nadu, and is one of the major transportation hubs in Tamil Nadu. The floating population is much heavier in the city . Most of the people from southern districts visit for medical, educational, marketing, cargo, shopping, tourism or official purposes. It is the one of the important traffic circles in Tamil Nadu.

There are 30,126 registered three-wheeled vehicles called auto rickshaws, which are commercially available for renting within the city. In addition to the government operated city buses that are used for public transport, there are 236 registered private mini-buses that support local transportation. Madurai connects with the following major national highways;

The state highways passing through the city are SH-32, SH-33 and SH-72, which connect various parts of Madurai district. Madurai is one of the seven circles of the Tamil Nadu State Highway network, is the headquarters of the Tamil Nadu State Transport Corporation (Madurai) and provides local and inter-city bus transport across four districts, namely Madurai, Dindigul, Theni, Virudhunagar, .

City bus service 

The Madurai Bus Rapid Transit System will plays a vital role in public transportation in the city of madurai. It will increase the frequency of busses and reduces the travelling time.

Madurai city has major city bus stands and originating terminals such as;

 Periyar bus stand Madurai central
 Anna bus stand Madurai east
 Anuppanadi bus stand Madurai east
 Pudur Bus stand Madurai north
 Palanganatham Bus stand Madurai south
 Thiruparakundram Bus stand Madurai south
 Thirunagar bus stand Madurai south
 Thirumangalam bus stand Madurai suburb
 Melur Bus stand Madurai north east
 Parktown Bus stand  Madurai north
 Vadipatti Bus stand Madurai West
Mahatma Gandhi nagar bus stand Madurai north
Anaiyur bus stand Madurai North
Vandiyur bus stand Madurai South
Peraiyur Bus stand Madurai Suburb
T. Kallupatti Bus stand Madurai Suburb
Usilambatti Bus stand Madurai Suburb
Elumalai Bus stand Madurai Suburb
Thiruppalai Bus stand Madurai North
Alanganallur Bus stand Madurai Suburb
Palamedu Bus stand Madurai Suburb
Azhagar kovil Bus stand Madurai North
Sholavandan Bus stand Madurai Suburb
Kottambatti Bus stand Madurai Suburb
MGR Bus(MATTUTHAVANI) stand Madurai North
Arappalayam Bus stand Madurai North
Ellisnagar Bus stand Madurai North
Madurai Airport Bus Stand Madurai South
 
Madurai city has the best city bus service second only to Chennai. The major city areas are connected by Madurai city bus service. Most of the buses, like Ashok leyland and TATA Marcopolo, are equipped with LED Displays and some of the Pseudo SLF buses are equipped with GPS which announce the bus stops for passengers. The city buses are available during day time, but some important areas have city bus services all day long.

Mofussil Bus service 

Madurai has two important mofussil bus terminus;

 M.G.R Bus Stand
 Arappalayam Bus Terminus

M.G.R Bus Stand
M.G.R Bus Stand is an ISO 9001:2000 certified integrated mofussil bus stand in the city of Madurai, Tamil Nadu, India and it is the second largest bus terminus in Tamil Nadu. It is the second busiest mofussil bus terminus in Tamil Nadu after CMBT. The bus station was built at the cost of R100 million.[1] After the successful launch of this new bus stand, more mofussil buses are being operated to the southern districts of Tirunelveli, Thoothukudi, Virudhunagar, Kanyakumari, Ramanathapuram, Sivaganga and Northern districts like Chennai, Vellore, Trichy, Viluppuram, Perambalur, Pudukkottai, Kumbakonam Thanjavur, Tiruvarur, Nagapattinam, Cuddalore, Tiruvannamalai from the station.

Aarapalayam bus Terminus 

This is another important bus stand in Madurai. Some of the city buses operating here are Coimbatore region and Salem region. The cities like Dindigul, Theni, Coimbatore, Tirupur, Erode, Ooty, Palani, Salem, Oddanchatram, Karur, Dharmapuri, Hosur, Kodaikanal and Pollachi.

In Arapalayam Bus Terminus there are 10 tracks are used to handle the mofussil buses

Upcoming: Because the size of a bus Terminus and located inside the city & increase in number of bus ply, this Bus Terminus always seems congested. So City corporation is planned to set up BUS PORT near upcoming AIIMS .In future Arapalayam Bus Terminus is moved out of city to decongest the city traffic.

Rail 

Madurai Junction railway station is one of the major railway junctions in south India and the headquarters of Madurai railway division. It is well connected with all major cities in India. Madurai division is the second largest by revenue in Southern Railway. It is one of the A1 graded stations in the Southern Railway (railway stations which earn of Rs. 50Cr p.a will get an A1 Grade). Madurai has two terminals:

 Madurai Junction railway station (Passenger handling)
 Koodal Nagar railway station (Goods handling)

Madurai Junction is an important railway junction in southern Tamil Nadu and constitutes a separate division of the Southern Railway. It is the second largest revenue division in Southern railway next to the Chennai division. There are direct trains from Madurai connecting important cities in India like Chennai, Mumbai, New Delhi, Bangalore, Hyderabad, Trivandrum, Coimbatore, Kollam, Kanyakumari, Trichy, Tirunelveli, Rameswaram, Thanjavur, Kumbakonam, Vijaywada, Calcutta, Nagpur, and Bhopal. The state government announced a monorail project for Madurai in 2011 named as Madurai Monorail, which is in its planning stages.

Railway lines in Madurai Junction

Suburban railway stations in Madurai

Air 

Madurai International Airport (IATA: IXM, ICAO: VOMD) is a customs airport serving Madurai in the state of Tamil Nadu. The airport is located about 12 km (7.5 mi) from the Madurai railway station. The airport was established in 1956 and is one of the most important airports in Tamil Nadu.  It offers domestic flight services to major cities in India and international flights to Colombo, Sri Lanka began on 20 September 2012. Now, it also offers services to Dubai and Singapore. Air India Express, IndiGo, Air India and SpiceJet operate from the airport.  The airport handled 520,000 passengers between April 2011 and March 2012.

Terminals
The airport has two adjacent terminals. Currently the integrated terminal is being used for both international and domestic purposes. The Airports Authority of India is planning to convert the old terminal into a cargo complex.

Passenger terminal

As the part of modernising 35 non-metropolitan airports, AAI constructed a state-of-art new integrated passenger terminal adjacent to the old terminal. The  new integrated passenger terminal building was inaugurated on 12 September 2010. This terminal with an area of  can handle a passenger capacity of 250 each on arrival and departure. The airport parking area has the capacity to park 375 cars and 10 buses. Some of the features of the new terminal include:

16 Check-in counters
12 Immigration counters
1 Security counter
5 customs counters
3 Conveyor belts ( each)
2 X-ray scanners for baggage
105 CISF strength
Total aircraft stands = 7
1 B767-400
1 A310-300
3 B737-800W/A320-200
2 ATR 72–500.

The new terminal has two lounges, a VIP lounge managed by AAI and the Commercial Important persons (CIP) lounge managed by TNCC-Madurai.

Cargo terminal
Considering the growing cargo potential in Madurai International Airport, AAI has decided to modify the old terminal into a full-fledged cargo complex. To start with, the union finance ministry has issued customs notifications dated 28 May 2013 regarding the handling of cargo at the Madurai International Airport.

Airlines and destinations

See also 
 Madurai Monorail
 Madurai International Airport
 Madurai Junction
 Transport in Chennai
 Transport in India
 Mattuthavani

References

 
Madurai